Michael Southern (born 31 October 1968) is an English former professional association footballer who played as a central defender. He played for Burnley between 1985 and 1987. His only senior appearance came in the 0–2 defeat to Bolton Wanderers in the Associate Members' Cup on 16 December 1986.

References
Michael Southern profile at clarets-mad.co.uk

1968 births
Living people
People from Lytham St Annes
English footballers
Association football defenders
Burnley F.C. players